Events in the year 1886 in India.

Incumbents
Empress of India – Queen Victoria
 Viceroy of India – The Earl of Dufferin

Events
 National income - 4,193 million
Trinomali or Tiruvannamalai, a cheftian town, an ancient mart and the headquarters of the taluk of same name in South Arcot district in Madras Presidency was constituted as municipality. It was shifted to North Arcot district later. After independence, the city and few taluks of North Arcot district separated as new district with Trinomali as headquarters.
Annexation of Burma

Law
Indian Tramways Act
Births, Deaths and Marriages Registration Act
Medical Act (British statute)

Births
25 th may-great revolutionary Rash Behari Bose was born in village Subaldaha in 1886.
16 January – Chenganoor Raman Pillai, Kathakali artiste (d.1980).

Deaths
16 August – Sri Ramakrishna (born 1836)

 
India
Years of the 19th century in India